Lee Jong-soo (born October 21, 1976) is a South Korean actor.

Filmography

Film

Television series

Awards and nominations

References

External links

1976 births
Living people
South Korean male television actors
South Korean male film actors
South Korean television personalities
Dankook University alumni